Deirdre Bolton is an American television anchor who is a current ABC News correspondent.  She previously was the host of Risk & Reward on Fox Business. Bolton lives in New York.

Biography
Deirdre Bolton graduated from the University of Iowa with a degree in English and French literature in 1993.  She graduated from Council Rock High School in Bucks County Pennsylvania in 1989. Bolton holds a master's degree from New York University. She is married to Lawrence Lease and has two children.

Bolton formerly anchored Bloomberg Television's Money Moves, a show about alternative investments. She started at Bloomberg in 2009. On January 31, 2014, she left Bloomberg for Fox Business News to host a new business show Risk & Reward. However, Bolton was absent from the show for nearly a year due to an injury she sustained in the summer of 2016 that required a long recovery period.

References

External links
 ABC News - Bloomberg's Deirdre Bolton on the Recent Report Showing Home Prices are Rising 10.27.09

Living people
American expatriates in France
American reporters and correspondents
American business and financial journalists
New York University alumni
University of Iowa alumni
American television news anchors
American women television journalists
Fox Business people
Women business and financial journalists
Year of birth missing (living people)
21st-century American women